Frederick Richard Castle (10 April 1902 – after 1930) was a Welsh professional footballer who played as a forward.

Career
After playing for local Welsh sides and Mid Rhondda, Castle made his professional debut for Cardiff City on Christmas Day 1926 in a 5–0 defeat to Newcastle United. He later played for Chesterfield and Gillingham before moving back into non-league football.

References

1902 births
Date of death missing
Welsh footballers
Mid Rhondda F.C. players
Cardiff City F.C. players
Chesterfield F.C. players
Gillingham F.C. players
Derry City F.C. players
Doncaster Rovers F.C. players
English Football League players
Association football forwards